Roman Romanuk (was born on 18 October 1961, Chernivtsi) is a Ukrainian politician. People's Deputy of Ukraine of the VII, VIIIth convocation.

Bibliography 
He was born on 18 October 1961 in Chernivtsi. In early he stayed alone without parents that is why appeared to be in asylum “The House of orphans», and later on in children's home «Romashka». Secondary education he got in boarding school. After that he entered technical college No. 2 (Chernivtsi) where he got a profession of the wireman of electric and radio equipment.
1980—1982 — served in the Soviet Army.
In 1988 he graduated from law faculty of Taras Shevchenko National University of Kyiv on specialty "Law". He worked in organs of state authority and organs of local management in Kyiv;
1997—2007 – a deputy manager, a manager of interaction management with courts, law enforcement agencies and law enforcement agency of Kyiv City State Administration.
In 2004 he graduated from National Academy for Public Administration under the President of Ukraine and got a qualification «Master of State Management».
Since 2007 – the chairman of the Executive Board of the Charity organization «Fund of law enforcement agencies of the capital».
2008—2012 – was elected a depute of Kyiv City Council of the 6th convocation; was a member of the committee on the questions of law and order, rules of procedure and deputy's ethics.
2009—2010 – a chairman of political party "Nova Kraina".
2012 – was elected a people's depute of Ukraine of the 7th convocation; post – a deputy manager of the Verkhovna Rada's of Ukraine Committee on the questions of the supremacy of law and right.
At the snap elections to the Verkhovna Rada he was elected the people's deputy of Ukraine for the second time of the VIII convocation, on general state multi-mandate constituency of the party «Petro Poroshenko Blok»<ref, number in the list is 25. A member of deputy's fraction of the party «Petro Poroshenko Blok», a post – a chairman of subcommittee on the questions of legal status of the High Council of Justice, High Judicial Qualifications Commission of judges of Ukraine in the Verkhovna Rada on the questions of law policy and right.

Romanyuk is a candidate (number 6 on the election list) for the Kyiv City Council of the party UDAR in the 2020 Kyiv local election set for 25 October 2020.

Family 
He is married, has a daughter.

Orders 
Honoured lawyer of Ukraine;
Certificate of Appreciation of the Ukraine's Cabinet of Ministers
Departmental orders of Ministry of Internal Affairs of Ukraine, National Security Agency of Ukraine, General Prosecutor Office of Ukraine, Tax Administration of Ukraine;
The Order of the St. Equal to the Apostles Knight Volodymyr of the III, II class;
Order of St. Andrew.

References

External links

 Parliament of Ukraine, official web portal
 https://www.youtube.com/user/romanyukrs
 https://www.youtube.com/watch?v=MpmRxeq7Y60

1961 births
Living people
Politicians from Chernivtsi
University of Kyiv, Law faculty alumni
Ukrainian jurists
Seventh convocation members of the Verkhovna Rada
Eighth convocation members of the Verkhovna Rada
Ukrainian Democratic Alliance for Reform politicians
21st-century Ukrainian politicians
Recipients of the Honorary Diploma of the Cabinet of Ministers of Ukraine